The Watts Free Library is a historic library located on Third Street in Leonard, North Dakota.  It was built in 1911 and dedicated in 1913 with funding from Edgerton Watts.  The building includes Stick/Eastlake architecture.  The library was closed in 1968 but reopened in 1972.  It was listed on the National Register of Historic Places in 1990.

It was the first township library, and perhaps the smallest library, and in perhaps the smallest community to have a library, in the state of North Dakota.

References

Library buildings completed in 1911
Libraries on the National Register of Historic Places in North Dakota
Stick-Eastlake architecture in the United States
1913 establishments in North Dakota
National Register of Historic Places in Cass County, North Dakota
Public libraries in North Dakota